Anagapetus bernea is a species of little black caddisfly in the family Glossosomatidae. It is found in North America. It was named in 1947.

References

Glossosomatidae
Articles created by Qbugbot
Insects described in 1947